The Return of Monte Cristo (Sous le signe de Monte-Cristo) is a French film (1968) directed by André Hunebelle.

Plot
Edmond Dantes (Paul Barge), imprisoned in Sisteron for denouncing and allowing the dismemberment of a whole network of resistance, escapes in the company of his friend Bertuccio (Paul Le Person) in 1947 to South America. But the wreckage of the plane was soon rescued near Brazil and the two fugitives are considered dead. They save the life of a young girl, Linda (Claude Jade), and her father Louis (Gabriel Gascon) in the wilderness. One day Linda is kidnapped. The bandits seek to do violence. The release ended with the murdering of her father. Dantes and Bertuccio promise to never abandon Linda. The years pass, but the chances of their misfortune lead them to meet a drunk man, Faria (Pierre Brasseur), who claims to hold a treasure. Two days later the three men and Linda set off for the mountains, carrying high explosives needed to clear a path to the location of treasure ... Rich, with a new name Christian Montes, Edmond introduced into the environment where Morcerf (Raymond Pellegrin) - who married Edmond's bride Maria (Anny Duperey) - and Villefort (Michel Auclair) and live luxuriously thanks to the millions stolen that enabled their success. He finds the informant confirms her suspicions and draws in a trap the two instigators of the felony. Linda brings a snare to the master Villefort, who wants to kill Edmond for a second time...

Cast
Paul Barge - Edmond Dantès
Claude Jade - Linda
Anny Duperey - Maria
Pierre Brasseur - Faria
Paul Le Person - Bertuccio
Michel Auclair - Villefort
Raymond Pellegrin - Morcerf
Jean Saudray - Carderousse
Gabriel Gascon - Louis

External links 

1968 adventure films
French adventure films
Films based on The Count of Monte Cristo
Films shot in Almería
Films directed by André Hunebelle
1960s French films